San Borja may refer to:
 San Borja, Bolivia
 San Borja Municipality, Bolivia
 San Borja District, Peru
 São Borja, Brazil